Michael Joe Cosgrave (9 March 1938 – 9 January 2022) was an Irish Fine Gael politician who served as a Teachta Dála (TD) from 1977 to 1992 and 1997 to 2002.

Cosgrave was born on 9 March 1938. He was educated at St. Joseph's Secondary CBS in Fairview, at the School of Management Studies in Rathmines, and at University College Dublin.

He was first elected to Dáil Éireann as a Fine Gael TD for the Dublin Clontarf constituency at the 1977 general election. When that constituency was abolished, Cosgrave was elected as TD for Dublin North-East at the 1981 general election. There he retained his seat until losing it at the 1992 general election, his defeat owing to the national swing to the Labour Party. He regained his seat at the 1997 general election but lost it again in 2002.

In the 1999 local elections Cosgrave was elected as a member of Fingal County Council for the Dublin suburb of Howth. He retained his seat in 2004, and retired in 2009.

Cosgrave died in Dublin on 9 January 2022, at the age of 83. His daughter Niamh Cosgrave is a former politician and campaigner.

References

1938 births
2022 deaths
Fine Gael TDs
Councillors of Dublin County Council
Local councillors in Fingal
Members of the 21st Dáil
Members of the 22nd Dáil
Members of the 23rd Dáil
Members of the 24th Dáil
Members of the 25th Dáil
Members of the 26th Dáil
Members of the 28th Dáil
People educated at St. Joseph's CBS, Fairview
Alumni of University College Dublin